Bazeran (also Romanized as Bāzerān) is a village in Pish Khowr Rural District, Pish Khowr District, Famenin County, Hamadan Province, Iran. At the 2006 census, its population was 116, in 33 families.

References 

Populated places in Famenin County